Brishaketu Debbarma is a politician from Tripura, India. He was a member of 12th Tripura Legislative Assembly. He was elected to the Assembly in 2018, representing the Simna constituency) as a member of the Indigenous People's Front of Tripura. He resigned from the Legislative Assembly on 29 June 2021 and joined The Indigenous Progressive Regional Alliance (TIPRA) on 9 July 2021.

References

Tripura MLAs 2018–2023
Living people
Tripuri people
1977 births
Indigenous People's Front of Tripura
Tripura MLAs 2023–2028
Tipra Motha Party politicians